Moses Ehrich (fl. 1850–1875) was an American businessman and underworld figure known as Old Unger who served as a fence to burglars, thieves and shoplifters from his Eldridge Street store throughout the mid to late 19th century. He was indicted four or five times on charges of receiving stolen goods during the administration of New York City Mayor A. Oakey Hall, but always escaped conviction. Ehrich was represented by Hall in later years.

Disappearance
In 1875, Ehrich was indicted for his involvement in the infamous Adams Express safe robbery and was accused of receiving stolen bonds and an uncut diamond valued at $800. Released on a $5,000 bond, Ehrich disappeared from the city shortly after the conviction of ringleader Daniel Haurey. In spite of efforts by District Attorney Horace Russell and the New York Police Department, Ehrich escaped to Canada.

See also
List of fugitives from justice who disappeared

References

American merchants
Criminals from New York City
Fugitives
Fugitives wanted by the United States
Year of birth missing
Year of death missing